Ellen Marie Estes (born October 13, 1978 in Portland, Oregon) is an American water polo player, who won the silver medal at the 2000 Summer Olympics. She also won a bronze medal at the 2004 Summer Olympics. Estes scored three goals during the bronze medal game against Australia.

Estes played for Stanford University. She was a senior on the 2002 NCAA National Championship Team; was a two-time All-American; and broke a Stanford scoring record with 93 goals in her sophomore year. She graduated with an Engineering degree at Stanford, and interned for studied roller-coaster design as an intern with Disney.

In 2003, Estes was named the USA Water Polo Female Athlete of the Year.

From 2007–2009, Estes served as a volunteer assistant coach for the Harvard University Men's and Women's Water Polo Teams, while finishing her MBA at Harvard Business School.

In 2012, she was inducted into the USA Water Polo Hall of Fame.

Performances
 Olympic Games: Silver Medal (2000), Bronze Medal (2004)
 World Championships: Gold Medal (2003)
 Pan American Games: Second Place (1999)
 FINA World Cup: Second Place (2002)

See also
 United States women's Olympic water polo team records and statistics
 List of Olympic medalists in water polo (women)
 List of world champions in women's water polo
 List of World Aquatics Championships medalists in water polo

References

External links
 

1978 births
Living people
American female water polo players
Water polo players at the 2000 Summer Olympics
Water polo players at the 2004 Summer Olympics
Stanford Cardinal women's water polo players
Sportspeople from Portland, Oregon
Medalists at the 2004 Summer Olympics
Harvard Business School alumni
World Aquatics Championships medalists in water polo
Medalists at the 2000 Summer Olympics
Olympic silver medalists for the United States in water polo
Olympic bronze medalists for the United States in water polo
American water polo coaches